St Benet's Hall Boat Club is a rowing club for members of St Benet's Hall, Oxford. It is based on the Isis at Boathouse Island, Christ Church Meadow, Oxford.

History
The club was founded in 1981.

It regularly participates in the Torpids and Summer Eights. Women joined the club in 2016 after purchasing their first boat called Ithaca.

In its relatively short history the men’s boat has enjoyed periods of considerable success. In the mid 2000s the club was especially successful, moving up to division 4 in both Torpids and Eights. During this period the club won blades on several occasions. In 2015 the men's crew secured discretionary blades for their performance in Eights, with the crew re-established firmly in fixed divisions. In 2019, they secured blades again in a monumental Torpids run that saw them move up 7 places into fixed divisions.

The first women's boat, 'Ithaca', was purchased in 2016, the year when women could first join the Hall as undergraduates. The St Benet's Hall women have since competed in several regattas, qualifying for their first Summer Eights in 2018, and then their first Torpids in 2019. In Summer Eights 2019 they achieved their first bump, and bumped on three out of four days (missing out on the fourth bump, and blades, because of a klaxon). Their newest boat, ‘Gowney-Hedges’, was kindly purchased by Rhys and Gillian Hedges after their impressive 2019 bumps campaign, and they now hope to win blades. 

For the first time in the club's history, St Benet's Hall women won blades in Summer Eights 2022, moving up 7 places and achieving five bumps in five starts.

The men's boat is stored at the Corpus Christi College Boat Club boathouse, whereas the women's boat is racked in the Lady Margaret Hall Boat Club boathouse.

Since May 2021 the official main sponsor of the boat club has been Fintalent.io

See also
University rowing (UK)
Oxford University Boat Club
Rowing on the River Thames

References

Rowing clubs of the University of Oxford
St Benet's Hall, Oxford
Sports clubs established in 1981
Rowing clubs in Oxfordshire
Rowing clubs of the River Thames
Sport in Oxford
Rowing clubs in England